The Dead Writers Theatre Collective is a Chicago-based theatre company. The company performs shows written by or about dead writers with the tagline "Classic Theatre Resurrected." The company is a non-profit theatre organization.

History 
The Dead Writers Theatre Collective was founded in 2011 by Jim Schneider and Bob Douglas. Schneider acts as the current artistic director and Douglas as the managing director. The company focuses on putting on historically accurate shows that use classic and traditional theater techniques.

On February 23, 2017, The Dead Writers Theatre Collection closed down after controversy with Schneider making comments on social media feeds of local performers. Further stories emerged of misconduct in the theatre's past.

Productions 
The Dead Writers Theatre Collective has put on shows written by notable authors from the Western Canon. These include authors such as Oscar Wilde, Noël Coward, and Jane Austen. Their productions focus on the author's unique voice and the time period in which they wrote their plays.

The company performs in various theater venues around Chicago such as Stage 773  and the Greenhouse Theater.  Their production history is as follows:

2016 
 The Importance of Being Earnest
 Oh, Coward!

2015 
 The Learned Ladies
 The Judas Kiss (play)

2014 
 The Game of Love and Chance
 The House of Mirth
 Emma (novel)

2013 
 Lady Windermere's Fan
 Tea with Edie and Fitz

2012 
 Loos Ends
 The Vortex

Awards and recognition
The Dead Writers Theatre Collective is recognized by the Jeff Awards for non-equity regional theater. Their 2016 production of Oh, Coward! was a Jeff Recommended Show.

External links 
 Official Website
 League of Chicago Theatres
 Official Facebook Page

References 

Theatre companies in Chicago